Cyclin-D1-binding protein 1 is a protein that in humans is encoded by the CCNDBP1 gene.

This gene was identified by the interaction of its gene product with Grap2, a leukocyte-specific adaptor protein important for immune cell signaling. The protein encoded by this gene was shown to interact with cyclin D. Transfection of this gene in cells was reported to reduce the phosphorylation of Rb gene product by cyclin D-dependent protein kinase, and inhibit E2F1-mediated transcription activity. This protein was also found to interact with helix-loop-helix protein E12 and is thought to be a negative regulator of liver-specific gene expression. Two alternatively spliced variants, which encode distinct isoforms, have been reported.

Interactions
CCNDBP1 has been shown to interact with GRAP2 and Cyclin D1.

References

Further reading

External links